George Edward Foreman III (born January 23, 1983) is an American entrepreneur, professional boxer, trainer/coach, founder of EverybodyFights and son of businessman and former two-time heavyweight champion George Foreman.

Early life
As a child, Foreman watched his father train and sat ringside when his father was doing color commentary. He always loved boxing, but never got involved with the sport until his early teens. Foreman attended Fay School in Southborough, Massachusetts. He graduated from Culver Military Academy in Culver, Indiana, in 2001 with a high school diploma, where he played lacrosse.

When he was 19, he went to the gym to do some sparring, but never went back because he did not want his father to find out. His mother, Andrea Skeete-Foreman, never thought that he would ever become a boxer  because he was so calm and would never lose his temper.

Foreman earned his BA from Rice University where he studied Business and Sports Management, and went on to serve as the business manager of his father's empire and executive vice president of George Foreman Enterprises, Inc.

Foreman starred on the E! network's reality series Filthy Rich: Cattle Drive.

Boxing career 
George III spent his entire youth absorbing the history and art form that is boxing and boxing training. He went on to pursue his own professional boxing career in 2009 and finished with a perfect 16-0 record.

Foreman started training for boxing in July 2009, with very similar training methods to his father the "torture chamber", in which he dragged a Jeep as far as he could, dug holes, chopped wood and ran to the point of exhaustion.

He made his professional debut stopping Clyde Weaver at 1:16 of the first round. He floored Weaver twice: first with a left to the chin, then with a left to the body, before the referee called a halt to the match. He won his third pro fight on September 26, 2009, at the Coushatta Casino in Kinder, Louisiana, against Marvin Ray Jones by TKO in the first round. He is currently 16–0 in professional boxing as of December 2012. His last bout was on December 6, 2012, in Cancún, Mexico. Analysts have mentioned that Foreman possesses similarities to his father's boxing traits, such as his stamina and power. Other analysts have commented that Foreman has a great combination of strength, speed, and agility. Foreman's power is also evident when looking at his boxing records: he is 16–0 with 15 of his wins having been a KO or TKO and 1 win ending in a unanimous decision.

Business 
In 2013, George Foreman III opened a boxing fitness gym in Boston called "The Club by George Foreman III".  In an effort to further promote the core beliefs of the gym's culture George eventually changed the name of the gym to EverybodyFights. George announced in January 2021 via Instagram that he was no longer affiliated with Everybodyfights. No reason was given.

In 2016, the company received a series-A investment from Breakaway in the form of $4 million and soon after announced the opening of another location in Boston. Since then, EverybodyFights has opened 5 locations and plans to open over 20 new locations by 2020 for growth in other major cities across the U.S.

Professional boxing record

| style="text-align:center;" colspan="8"|16 Wins (15 knockouts, 1 decision),  0 Losses, 0 Draws
|-
|align=center style="border-style: none none solid solid; background: #e3e3e3"|Res.
|align=center style="border-style: none none solid solid; background: #e3e3e3"|Record
|align=center style="border-style: none none solid solid; background: #e3e3e3"|Opponent
|align=center style="border-style: none none solid solid; background: #e3e3e3"|Type
|align=center style="border-style: none none solid solid; background: #e3e3e3"|Rd., Time
|align=center style="border-style: none none solid solid; background: #e3e3e3"|Date
|align=center style="border-style: none none solid solid; background: #e3e3e3"|Location
|align=center style="border-style: none none solid solid; background: #e3e3e3"|Notes
|-align=center
|Win
|align=center|16–0||align=left| David Ferraez
|
|
|
|align=left|
|align=left|
|-align=center
|Win
|align=center|15–0||align=left| David Robinson
|
|
|
|align=left|
|align=left|
|-align=center
|Win
|align=center|14–0||align=left| Alonzo Toney
|
|
|
|align=left|
|align=left|
|-align=center
|Win
|align=center|13–0||align=left| Shannon Caudle
|
|
|
|align=left|
|align=left|
|-align=center
|Win
|align=center|12–0||align=left| Eric Lindsey
|
|
|
|align=left|
|align=left|
|-align=center
|Win
|align=center|11–0||align=left| Christopher Jones
|
|
|
|align=left|
|align=left|
|-align=center
|Win
|align=center|10–0||align=left| David Robinson
|
|
|
|align=left|
|align=left|
|-align=center
|Win
|align=center|9–0||align=left| James Johnson
|
|
|
|align=left|
|align=left|
|-align=center
|Win
|align=center|8–0||align=left| Bobby Pickett
|
|
|
|align=left|
|align=left|
|-align=center
|Win
|align=center|7–0||align=left| Dale Mitchell
|
|
|
|align=left|
|align=left|
|-align=center
|Win
|align=center|6–0||align=left| Robert Vasquez
|
|
|
|align=left|
|align=left|
|-align=center
|Win
|align=center|5–0||align=left| Yul Witherspoon
|
|
|
|align=left|
|align=left|
|-align=center
|Win
|align=center|4–0||align=left| Bradley Moss
|
|
|
|align=left|
|align=left|
|-align=center
|Win
|align=center|3–0||align=left| Marvin Ray Jones
|
|
|
|align=left|
|align=left|
|-align=center
|Win
|align=center|2–0||align=left| George Burrage
|
|
|
|align=left|
|align=left|
|-align=center
|Win
|align=center|1–0|| align=left| Clyde Weaver
|
|
|
|align=left|
|align=left|

See also 
 Notable boxing families

References

External links 
 

1983 births
Living people
Boxers from Texas
Culver Academies alumni
People from Humble, Texas
Rice University alumni
Sportspeople from Harris County, Texas
American male boxers
Fay School alumni
Heavyweight boxers